Thieves Fall Out is a 1941 American comedy film directed by Ray Enright, written by Charles Grayson and Ben Markson, and starring Eddie Albert, Joan Leslie, Jane Darwell, Alan Hale, Sr., William T. Orr and John Litel. It was released by Warner Bros. on May 3, 1941.

Plot

The movie follows the life of Eddie Barnes, who is employed by his father, Rodney, the owner of Barnes Slumber Accessories Company.  Eddie is deeply in love with Mary Matthews, the daughter of Charles Matthews, Rodney's competitor, but lacks the financial means to marry her. Fearing that Mary will leave him for someone else, Eddie implores his father for a pay raise, but his request is denied.  In a bid to secure his future with Mary, Eddie decides to use his mother's inheritance to purchase a business. However, Eddie's plan is thwarted when the broker assigned to collect the policy's full amount is unable to do so due to Eddie's mother being alive.  The broker's partner, a gangster, refuses to wait for the full amount and decides to take matters into his own hands. Throughout the movie, Eddie is seen struggling to rescue his grandmother from the kidnappers, while at the same time confronting Chic Collins and his gang.

Cast  
Eddie Albert as Eddie Barnes
Joan Leslie as Mary Matthews
Jane Darwell as Grandma Allen
Alan Hale, Sr. as Rodney Barnes
William T. Orr as George Formsby
John Litel as Tim Gordon
Anthony Quinn as Chic Collins
Edward Brophy as Rork
Minna Gombell as Ella Barnes
Vaughan Glaser as Charles Matthews
Nana Bryant as Martha Matthews
Edward Gargan as Kane
Hobart Cavanaugh as David Tipton
Frank Faylen as Pick
William B. Davidson as Harry Eckles 
Etta McDaniel as Blossom

References

External links 
 

1941 films
1940s English-language films
Warner Bros. films
American comedy films
1941 comedy films
Films directed by Ray Enright
American black-and-white films
1940s American films
English-language comedy films